Rock Hard may refer to the following:

Music
"Rock Hard", a 1984 single by the Beastie Boys
"We Rock Hard", a 1998 song by the Freestylers from the album of the same name
"Rock Hard Times", a 2003 song from the album Shootenanny! by American indie pop band Eels
Rock Hard, a 1980 album by Suzi Quatro
Rock Hard, a German music magazine
Rock Hard Festival, a heavy metal festival sponsored by the above magazine
"(You Make Me) Rock Hard", a 1988 song by Kiss

Television
"Christian Rock Hard", an episode from the American animated series South Park

Others
Rock Hard Ten, an American thoroughbred racehorse and sire
"Rock hard", a descriptor often used for abs or a cock

See also 

 Rock
Hardness
Concrete